Omar El Borolossy (born October 11, 1975 in Giza), also known as Omar Elborolossy, is a professional squash player who represents Egypt. He reached a career-high world ranking of World No. 14 in June 2001. He represented Egypt at the 1993 Men's World Team Squash Championships, 1995 Men's World Team Squash Championships and 1997 Men's World Team Squash Championships before helping Egypt win the title for the first time at the 1999 Men's World Team Squash Championships. He is married to squash player Salma Shabana, former female world No. 20.

References

External links 
 
 

Egyptian male squash players
Living people
1975 births